Charles Edward Francis Evans (7 January 1942 – 16 September 2021) was an Australian rules footballer who played with Footscray and South Melbourne in the Victorian Football League (VFL).

Evans, who was recruited locally, finished equal fifth in the 1961 Brownlow Medal count, with 12 votes.

He played as a back pocket in the 1961 VFL Grand Final, which Footscray lost to Hawthorn.

In 1962 he represented the VFL for the first time.

References

1942 births
2021 deaths
Australian rules footballers from Victoria (Australia)
Western Bulldogs players
Sydney Swans players